Andersson (previously Andjersson) is a Swedish language surname, a form of the surname Anderson. Andersson is, if several spelling variants are included, the most common surname in Sweden. Notable people with the surname include:

A–J
Anders Andersson (disambiguation), various people 
Arne Andersson (1917–2009), Swedish middle-distance runner
Augusta Andersson (1856–1938), restaurant owner 
Axel Andersson i Österfärnebo (1897–1979), Swedish politician
Benny Andersson (born 1946), musician (ABBA)
Bibi Andersson (1935–2019), Swedish actress
Birger Andersson (tennis) (born 1951), Swedish tennis player
Björn Andersson (born 1951), Swedish footballer
Conny Andersson (disambiguation), various people
Daniel Andersson, various people
Edoff Andersson (1902–1934), Swedish politician and trade unionist
Elsa Andersson (1897–1922), Swedish aviator and stunt parachutist
Emil Andersson (disambiguation), various people
Eric Andersson (born 1984), Swedish motorcycle speedway rider
Erik Andersson (disambiguation), various people
Eva Andersson (disambiguation), various people
Georg Andersson (politician) (born 1936), Swedish politician
Gunnar Andersson (disambiguation), various people
Gustaf Andersson (1884–1961), Swedish politician
Håkan Andersson (born 1945), Swedish motocross racer
Håkan Andersson (born 1965), Swedish amateur hockey scout
Harriet Andersson (born 1932), Swedish actress
Heidi Andersson (born 1981), Swedish arm wrestler
Henrik Andersson (badminton) (born 1977), Swedish badminton player
Ingemar Andersson (1928–1992), Swedish sprint canoer
Jan Anderson (disambiguation), various people
Jessica Andersson (born 1973), Swedish singer (Fame)
Joakim Andersson (diver) (born 1971), Swedish diver
Joakim Andersson (born 1989), Swedish ice hockey player
John Andersson, a Swedish football player 
Johan Andersson (disambiguation), various people
Johan Gunnar Andersson (1874–1960), Swedish archaeologist, paleontologist, geologist and author

K–Z
Kennet Andersson (born 1967), Swedish footballer
Kent Andersson (motorcyclist) (1942–2006), Swedish motorcycle racer
Kim Andersson (born 1982), Swedish professional handball player
Kjell-Åke Andersson (born 1949), Swedish film director, screenwriter, and cinematographer
Lars Anderson (disambiguation), various people
Magdalena Andersson (born 1967), Swedish politician
Maria Andersson (businesswoman) (1837–1922)
Mauritz Andersson (1886–1971) Swedish wrestler
Mette Andersson (born 1964), Norwegian sociologist
Nicke Andersson (born 1972), Swedish musician
Olga Andersson (1876–1943), Swedish actress
Olle Andersson (disambiguation), various people
Ove Andersson (1938–2008), Swedish rally driver
Patrik Andersson (born 1971), Swedish footballer
Per-Gunnar Andersson (racing driver) (born 1957), Swedish racing driver
Per-Gunnar Andersson (rally driver) (born 1980), Swedish rally driver
Peter Andersson (disambiguation), various people
Petra Andersson (born 1993), Swedish footballer
Rasmus Andersson (born 1996), Swedish ice hockey player
Roy Andersson (born 1943), Swedish film director
Roy Andersson (footballer) (born 1949), Swedish footballer
Theresa Andersson (born 1971), American musician
Thorsten Andersson (1923-2018), Swedish toponymist
Torsten Andersson (1926–2009), Swedish painter
Ulf Andersson (born 1951), Swedish chess player

References

Patronymic surnames
Swedish-language surnames
Surnames from given names